Orthocomotis miranda is a species of moth of the family Tortricidae. It is found in the Cordillera Occidental of Colombia.

The wingspan is 29 mm. The ground colour of the forewings is clear white with orange borders and spots, which become rust brown along the dorsum and in the basal third. The markings are dark brown. The hindwings are brown-grey.

Etymology
The species name refers to the fasciae of the species and is derived from Latin miranda (meaning worth admiration).

References

Moths described in 2011
Orthocomotis